Fergan Mirkelam (born 20 May 1966, Istanbul) is a Turkish singer. He first became known with his song "Her Gece" ("Every Night") in 1995.

Albums
Mirkelam (31 May 1995)
Joker (1998)
Unutulmaz (2001)
Kalbimde Parmak İzin Var (2004)
Mutlu Olmak İstiyorum (2006)
RRDP (Rakın Rol Disko Parti) - with Kargo (Sony Music 2010) 
Denizin Arka Yüzü (2013)
Mirkelam Şarkıları (2017, tribute album)

References

1966 births
Living people